Metan may refer to:
San José de Metán, usually shortened to Metán, a city in the south of the province of Salta, Argentina
Metán Viejo, a village and rural municipality in Salta Province
Metán Department, an administrative division of Salta Province, Argentina
Methane, a chemical compound